Black Star, also known as Black Star Publishing Company, was started by refugees from Germany who had established photographic agencies there in the 1930s. Today it is a New York City-based photographic agency with offices in London and in White Plains, New York.  It is known for photojournalism, corporate assignment photography and stock photography services worldwide. It is noted for its contribution to the history of photojournalism in the United States.  It was the first privately owned picture agency in the United States, and introduced numerous new techniques in photography and illustrated journalism. The agency was closely identified with Henry Luce's magazines Life and Time.

History

Black Star was formed in December 1935.  The three founders were Kurt Safranski, Ernest Mayer and Kurt Kornfeld. In 1964, the company was sold to Howard Chapnick.  The three founders; Safranski, Mayer and Kornfeld were German Jews who fled Berlin during the Nazi regime. They brought with them a wealth of knowledge and some new ideas for the American press.
 
Safranski was a graphic designer and editor for the Berliner Illustrirte Zeitung (BIZ),  which was part of the Ullstein publishing house. During the early 1930s, Ullstein Verlag was Germany's largest publisher of books, newspapers and magazines. BIZ's circulation was over one million.  While an editor at BIZ, Safranski was using two or more photos placed together to create a story which surpassed the need for text. Not only was this visually appealing, but it attracted more readers as well.

This drew the attention of the top American mass media publishers. William Randolph Hearst, a powerful media mogul of the day, who was intrigued by European advances in photography and printing. Hearst invited Safranski over to the United States to produce a dummy magazine using photos to tell the stories. Hearst liked the proposed idea but initially didn't move forward on it.  Mayer then brought the idea to the experimental editorial department of Henry Luce, the largest publisher of the day, with periodicals such as Time and Fortune.  Luce collaborated with Black Star to produce a new weekly magazine called Life.  Life would use artistic photos in a new format. These pictures would be large and take up the majority of the page. They could capture not only a moment in time, but an emotion and story that would be paramount to the text. Prior to this, photojournalism in the U.S. was relegated to regional newspapers where text was more important than photos.  Photos would sometimes be staged, posed or re-created to help a news article.  But this all changed with the advent of the 35mm camera.  The Leica, which was developed in Germany in 1925, was a small and easier to use camera.  Advances in half-tone printing made using photographs in periodicals easier. Safranski and Mayer were already familiar with photographers who used this new technology to capture more candid moments.

Mayer owned the publishing company and photo agency, Mauritius, in Berlin.  Forced by the Nazis to sell his business, he brought negatives, and connections to European photographers with him to the United States. The contacts included the notable photographers Dr. Paul Wolff  and Fritz Goro. These contacts with European-based photographers, and the photographic negatives he brought with him, became the foundation for the new business.

Kornfeld was a literary agent back in his native Germany where he had a talent for bringing together authors and editors.  Originally the idea for the company was to be a publishing house and a photo agency just like Mayer's Mauritius. However, the publishing business never took off and more profit was to be found in selling photos. Even though he had no experience with photography, Kornfeld became Black Star's best picture agent.  He had a talent for creating rapport between client and artist.  Therefore, Kornfeld handled their most important client, Life magazine, providing up to 200 photos a week.

Although Life was the agency's most high-profile client, Black Star also served other periodicals, newspapers, advertisers and publishers. Its stock of photography represents a pictorial history of the 20th century beginning in the 1930s. This archive was donated by Jimmy Pattison to Ryerson University in 2005.

Noted Black Star photographers include Robert Capa, Andreas Feininger, Germaine Krull, Philippe Halsman, Martin Munkácsi, Kurt Severin, W. Eugene Smith, Marion Post-Wolcott, Bill Brandt, Henri Cartier-Bresson, Skippy Adelman, Charles Moore, James Nachtwey, Lee Lockwood, Mario Giacomelli and Spider Martin.

In 2003, Black Star's archive of 292,000 prints, created by more than 6,000 photographers was acquired by Jimmy Pattison, a Canadian businessperson. In 2005, he donated it to Ryerson University in Toronto. In 2012, the Ryerson Image Centre was opened to house the collection.

Corporate assignment photography has become the largest segment of Black Star's business. The company claims to have captured more photographic images for more annual reports than any other photo agency or service.

References

Further reading
 Smith, C. Zoe. "Black Star Picture Agency: Life's European Connection", Journalism History (1986), 13#1, pp. 19–25.
 Kornfeld, Phoebe. Passionate Publishers: The Founders of the Black Star Photo Agency. Archway Publishing, 2021, ISBN 978-1-6657-0904-0.

External links
 
The Black Star Collection Lives On
Ryerson University: Black Star Historical Black & White Photography Collection
Matt Lutton, "Intern Diaries: Black Star" Sports Shooter, September 6, 2005

Photo agencies
Photography companies of the United States
Companies established in 1935